Le Prix du Danger (The Prize of Peril) is a 1983 French-Yugoslav science fiction movie, directed by Yves Boisset.  It is based on Robert Sheckley's short story "The Prize of Peril", published in 1958.

Premise
In the most popular television game show of the near future, regular people volunteer to be hunted by a team of five pursuers who are also volunteers. If they survive, they get an enormous cash prize, but no one has managed to survive the game show. A new volunteer needs the money to support his family.

See also 
 Das Millionenspiel – German TV movie from 1970
 The Running Man – 1987 film starring Arnold Schwarzenegger
 The Hunger Games (film series)

Bibliography
Willis, Donald C. (1985), Variety's Complete Science Fiction Reviews, Garland Publishing Inc, pp. 415–416,

External links 
 

1983 films
1980s dystopian films
French science fiction films
1983 science fiction films
Films directed by Yves Boisset
Films scored by Vladimir Cosma
Films shot in Serbia
Films about television
Films based on short fiction
Adaptations of works by Robert Sheckley
Films about death games
Yugoslav science fiction films
1980s French films